Bob Kosid (born February 27, 1942) is a retired Canadian football player who played for the Saskatchewan Roughriders. He won the Grey Cup with Saskatchewan in 1966. He is an alumnus of the University of Kentucky.

References

1942 births
Living people
Sportspeople from Brandon, Manitoba
Players of Canadian football from Manitoba
Saskatchewan Roughriders players